Keilor Lodge is a suburb in Melbourne, Victoria, Australia,  north-west of Melbourne's Central Business District, located within the City of Brimbank local government area. Keilor Lodge recorded a population of 1,668 at the 2021 census.

Keilor Lodge is bounded by Keilor North to the north, Keilor to the east and Taylors Lakes to the south and west.

See also
 City of Keilor – Keilor Lodge was previously within this former local government area.

References

Suburbs of Melbourne
Suburbs of the City of Brimbank